Newmarket Heath is a 279.3-hectare biological Site of Special Scientific Interest in Newmarket in Suffolk. It covers most of Newmarket Racecourse.

Most of this site is chalk grassland, and it has areas of chalk heath, a rare habitat in Britain. There is a rich variety of flowering plants, including a nationally rare species listed in the British Red Data Book of threatened species and five nationally uncommon ones. The dominant grasses are upright brome and sheep's fescue.

References

Sites of Special Scientific Interest in Suffolk